Events from the year 1942 in Sweden

Incumbents
 Monarch – Gustaf V
 Prime Minister – Per Albin Hansson

Events

 RIFA (manufacturer) is founded.

Births

 14 January – Stig Engström (actor)

Deaths

 25 January - Gertrud Adelborg, women's rights activist
 5 July – Karin Swanström, actress, producer and director
 26 June - Agda Östlund, suffragist and social democrat
 3 December – Wilhelm Peterson-Berger, composer

References

 
Years of the 20th century in Sweden
Sweden